Ponticola cyrius, the Kura goby, is a  species of gobiid fish endemic to the Kura River in the southern Caucasus countries of Georgia, Turkey, Iran and Azerbaijan. It reaches a length of  SL. It lives in the upper parts of the Kura River, Massuleh River and the Pasikhan River and in the Anzali Mordab (Iran). Downstream in Kura it is replaced by Ponticola gorlap.

References 

Ponticola
Freshwater fish of Western Asia
Taxa named by Karl Kessler
Fish described in 1874